Roser is a Spanish pop singer with four LPs.

Roser rose to fame in 2002 after participating in Spanish channel Telecinco's reality television programme Popstars.

Discography 
 2003: Desperté (100,000 copies sold)
 2004: Fuego (50,000 copies sold)
 2006: Raffaella (20,000 copies sold)
 2010: Clandestino (5,000 copies sold)

Videoclips 
 No vuelvas (2003)
 Quiero besarte (2003)
 Dueña de mi corazón (2003)
 Foc (version Catalan of "Fuego" - 2004)
 Fuego (2004)
 Boca a boca (2004)
 La trampa (2004)
 Rumore (2006)
 La Bestia (2009)
 La Bèstia (version in Catalan of "La Bestia" - 2009)
 Solo en ti (2010)
 Només tu (version in Catalan of "Solo en ti" - 2010)

Tours 
 2003: Gira Desperté (45 concerts)
 2004-2005: Gira Fuego (73 concerts)
 2006-2008: Gira Raffaella (51 Concerts)

References

1979 births
Living people